Ligang Township is a rural township in Pingtung County, Taiwan. The area is the site of the market town  (A-li-kang).

History
Scottish Presbyterian missionary William Campbell visited  (A-li-kang) in the mid 1870s.

Geography
It has a population total of 25,701 and an area of

Administrative divisions

The township comprises 14 villages: Chaocuo, Chunlin, Daping, Guojiang, Jiadong, Mili, Sanbu, Talou, Tiedian, Tuku, Yongchun, Yutian, Zaixing and Zhonghe.

References

External links

 Ligang Township Office 
 

Townships in Pingtung County